Dr Vance may refer to

 Dr Vance, associate and executor of dominatrix Theresa Berkley
 Eli Vance, a fictional character from the Half-Life 2 series of computer games by Valve